is the fifteenth film installment of the manga and anime series Case Closed. The film was released on April 16, 2011. This film celebrates the fifteenth anniversary of the anime. Magic File 2011, ties in with the film and was released on the same day as the film's premiere.

Plot
The Governor of Tokyo, Yuuichiro Asakura, receives a threatening letter the day before the opening of Touto Line, a new train line for the Tokyo Metro. During the opening ceremony of the line, Conan Edogawa and the Detective Boys are driven by Hiroshi Agasa and pass under the Touto Line. Conan, having heard about the threatening letter, notices explosives connected to the Touto railway; Using his original voice to inform the police as Shinichi Kudo, he is able to stop the train and divert traffic away from the explosives preventing any deaths. Conan researches Asakura's political history for a clue on the culprit and learns the governor was in charge of the construction of dam in Kitanosawa, a fictional town in the Niigata Prefecture. Due to the dam's construction, the citizens of Kitanosawa were forced into a new town and their old homes were drowned by the dam. Since Asakura's trip to celebrate the anniversary of the dam is canceled by the bombing, Conan speculates information on the bomber could be found in Kitanosawa and plans a trip there.

Conan, the Detective Boys, Ran Mori, Kogoro Mori, and Sonoko Suzuki travel to Kitanosawa and enjoy the day playing. They are introduced to a group of locals; their names are Keisuke Yamao, Mizuki Toono, Fuyumi Tachihara, Takehiki Mutou, and Shougo Hikawa. The group reveals they were all childhood friends and were part of the group which relocated to the new village. They also reveal it is their first gathering in eight years since Yamao was in prison for killing Toono's sister, Natsuki Toono, in a hit and run. The next day, Tachihara's son, Touma Tachihara, awakens from his eight-year coma with no memory of his accident. Later that day, Hikawa is found dead in a field. Originally, it was assumed to be suicide since only Hikawa's footprints were found in the snow. Conan reveals Hikawa was killed by an electroshock weapon. The culprit then waited for it to snow and walked away backwards to suggest Hikawa was alone. During a diamond dust caused by the sunrise, Touma experiences a flashback on the day of the accident.

Conan investigates Hikawa's belongings and finds a newspaper clipping detailing a jewelry store was robbed the day before the hit and run. A cell site is destroyed by bombs leading Conan to hypothesis who the culprit possibly is. Meanwhile, the Detective Boys and Touma are hunted down by a sniper. Conan intervenes and leads them to safety. Taking a route towards the dam, Conan explains Yamao is the culprit. Yamao robbed the jewelry store in a distant town and drives back to Kitanosawa. On the way, he runs over Natsuki, a scene which Touma notices. Touma is then kidnapped by Yamao and sees the diamonds, explaining why the diamond dust startled his memories. Touma escapes but falls down a cliff leading to his coma. Yamao then buries the jewels in a property in Kitanosawa and turns himself over to the authorities for Natsuki's death. Unexpectedly, the dam project forced the town of Kitanosawa underwater. As a result, Yamao decides to bomb the dam to search old-Kitanosawa for the diamonds. In order to have enough time to perform the search, he had to cancel the Governor's trip and destroy the cell site to prevent the outside world from learning off the dam's destruction.

Upon arriving at the dam, Conan is pursued by Yamao who intends to kill him. Yamao is then shot and incapacitated by Toono. Touma regains his memories of the accident upon seeing Toono and reveals he saw Toono push Natsuki off into the road. Toona professes she was the sniper attempting to kill Touma and that the death of her sister was an accident. Yamao, having set off the bombs in the dam forces them to flee. Conan diverges from the group intending to start an avalanche by creating grooves in a steep mountain with his motorized snowboard to divert the flow away from Kitanosawa. He is successful but his motor short-circuits causing him to be caught in the avalanche. He is eventually free when Ran calls Shinichi's cellphone causing him to regain consciousness to alert the others of his position.

Cast
Minami Takayama as Conan Edogawa
Kappei Yamaguchi as Shinichi Kudo
Rikiya Koyama as Kogoro Mori
Wakana Yamazaki as Ran Mori
Megumi Hayashibara as Ai Haibara
Naoko Matsui as Sonoko Suzuki
Kazuhiko Inoue as Ninzaburo Shiratori
Kenichi Ogata as Professor Agasa
Chafurin as Inspector Megure
Toshio Furukawa as Misao Yamamura
Wataru Takagi as Genta Kojima and Officer Takagi
Yukiko Iwai as Ayumi Yoshida
Ikue Ohtani as Mitsuhiko Tsuburaya
Keiichi Nanba as Keisuke Yamao
Kouki Miyata as Touma Tachihara
Mayumi Iizuka as Fuyumi Tachihara
Toshihiko Seki as Shougo Hikawa

Production
The film was announced to be in the making at the end of the fourteenth film, The Lost Ship in the Sky. The details of the film were announced on the official film website on December 4, 2010. On March 5, 2011, the site was updated again to a new updating revealing the 90 second trailer and the theme song.

In an interview with the Japanese magazine Otonafami, Gosho Aoyama revealed the setting is the snowy mountains due to the fact survivors will die in 15 minutes when buried under an avalanche.

Music
The official soundtrack of the film is conducted by Ono Katsuo and released on April 13, 2011. The theme song used for this film is "Don't Wanna Lie" by B'z.

References

External links
 
Official TMS website  
Official NTV website 
Official TMS website 

2011 anime films
TMS Entertainment
Toho animated films
Quarter of Silence
2010s Japanese-language films
Odex
Animated films set in Tokyo
Films set in Niigata Prefecture
Films directed by Kobun Shizuno